The 2012 Wagner Seahawks football team represented Wagner College in the 2012 NCAA Division I FCS football season as a member of the Northeast Conference (NEC). They were led by 32nd-year head coach Walt Hameline and played their home games at Wagner College Stadium. They are a member of the Northeast Conference. Wagner finished the season 9–4 overall 7–1 in NEC play to share the conference title with Albany. The Seahawks earned the conference's automatic bid into the NCAA Division I Football Championship playoffs, the first playoff appearance in school history, where they defeated Colgate in the first round before falling in the second round to Eastern Washington.

Schedule

References

Wagner
Wagner Seahawks football seasons
Northeast Conference football champion seasons
Wagner Seahawks football
Wagner Seahawks football